Slowpoke or Slow Poke may refer to:

 "Slow Poke", a 1951 American country music hit song
 "Slowpoke", a song by Crosby, Stills, Nash & Young
 Slowpoke (comic strip), weekly comic strip by Jen Sorensen
 Slowpoke (Pokémon), a fictional species in the Pokémon universe
 Slowpoke Rodriguez, character in Looney Tunes
 Slow Poke (Transformers), a fictional character
 SLOWPOKE reactor, nuclear research reactor
 Slowpoke or Athetis tarda, a moth in the family Noctuidae
 SLoWPoKES (Sloan Low-mass Wide Pairs of Kinematically Equivalent Stars), star catalogue of binary pairs created by the Sloan Digital Sky Survey